"Brian's Back" is a song by American rock band the Beach Boys that was recorded during the sessions for their 1979 album L.A. (Light Album). Written by Mike Love and produced by Paul Fauerso, the song addresses the "Brian Is Back!" media campaign from 1976. The players on the track included Carl Wilson, Ron Altbach, Dave Somerville, and Jerry Donahue.

Background and lyrics
Mike Love wrote the song as a response to the "Brian Is Back!" publicity campaign that had surrounded Brian Wilson and the release of the group's 1976 album 15 Big Ones. Love wrote in his memoir,

The lyrics contain references to "Fun, Fun, Fun", "I Get Around", "Good Vibrations", and Pet Sounds.

Release
"Brian's Back" was considered for inclusion on a Mike Love solo album, First Love, which was never released. Instead, the track was first released on the 1998 compilation Endless Harmony Soundtrack. In 2013, an alternate mix was included on the box set Made in California.

See also
 List of unreleased songs recorded by the Beach Boys

References

External links
 

Songs written by Mike Love
The Beach Boys songs
1979 songs
Songs about the Beach Boys
Songs based on actual events